"Double Tap" is a song recorded by American singer-songwriter Jordin Sparks, featuring Atlanta based rapper 2 Chainz. The song was released by Louder Than Life & Sony Music on March 3, 2015, as the lead single from Sparks' third studio album Right Here Right Now (2015). The song was written by Victoria Monét McCants, Thomas "Tommy" Parker Lumpkins & Tauheed Epps and Jonas Jeberg, with the latter also producing the track.

Music video
The music video for "Double Tap" was released on March 11, 2015, via Sparks' VEVO account.

Formats and track listings
 Digital download  
 "Double Tap (featuring 2 Chainz)" - 3:30

Credits and personnel
Credits adapted from Discogs.

Recording locations
Conway Studios, Los Angeles, CA 
Wolf Cousins Studios, Stockholm, Sweden

Vocal credits
Jordin Sparks – lead vocals
2 Chainz – featured artist

Technical credits
Songwriting – Jonas Jeberg, Tauheed Epps, Thomas "Tommy" Parker Lumpkins, Victoria Monet McCants
Production – Jonas Jeberg
Engineering – Finis "KY" White*, Gleyder "Gee" Disla, Jonas Jeberg
Engineering assistant – Ryan Kaul
Mixing – Jaycen Joshua
Mixing engineer – Jaycen Joshua
Mastering – Ari Blitz, Larry Ryckman

Charts

Radio and release history

References

Jordin Sparks songs
2015 songs
2015 singles
Songs written by Jonas Jeberg
Songs written by 2 Chainz
Songs written by Victoria Monét